North Straits Salish is a Salish language which includes the dialects of
Lummi (also known as W̱lemi,Ćosen, Xwlemiʼchosen, xʷləmiʔčósən)
Saanich (also known as Senćoten, sənčáθən, sénəčqən)
Samish (also known as Si, Námeś, Siʔneməš)
Semiahmoo (Semyome) (also known as Tah-tu-lo) (†)
T'sou-ke or Sooke (also known as Z̓owc, Tʼsou-ke, c̓awk) (†)
Songhees (also known as Leqeṉi, Neṉ, Lək̓ʷəŋín̓əŋ or Lekwungen or Songish), three speakers (2011)
Although they are mutually intelligible, each dialect is traditionally referred to as if it were a separate language, and there is no native term to encompass them all.

North Straits, along with Klallam, forms the Straits Salish branch of the Central Coast Salish languages.  Klallam and North Straits are very closely related, but not mutually intelligible.

See Saanich dialect for the phonology.

See also

References

External links

An Outline of the Morphology and Phonology of Saanich, North Straits Salish
Saanich, North Straits Salish Classified Word List

 
Coast Salish languages
Indigenous languages of the Pacific Northwest Coast
First Nations languages in Canada
Indigenous languages of Washington (state)